Cain and Abel (Italian: Caino e Abele) is an oil painting by the Venetian painter Titian. It was made in about 1543–1545 for the church of Santo Spirito, but is now in the basilica of Santa Maria della Salute.

Subject 
The scene in question is the first murder recounted in the Genesis narrative. Cain and Abel were two brothers, the first sons of Adam and Eve. Cain, the firstborn, was a farmer, and Abel was a shepherd. The brothers made sacrifices to God, but God accepted the firstlings offered by Abel rather than the first fruits offered by Cain. Cain, full of jealousy, called out Abel into the fields, and slew him.

History 
It was about the beginning of the 1540s that Titian received commissions for a great number of pictures from the brothers of the church of Santo Spirito, who already possessed the work of his early career, the San Marco Enthroned. One altarpiece represented the Descent of the Holy Spirit, but having been damaged had to be restored later by Titian. The picture on the same subject, which is now in the Church of the Salute, belongs to another period in Titian's activity. The whole collection of art treasures from Santo Spirito was transported to the Church of the Salute in the seventeenth century, where they remain today. 

In the ceiling of the sacristy of the Salute, above the altar, are three creations of this period: Cain and Abel, Abraham and Isaac, and David and Goliath.

Analysis 
Georg Gronau writes of these three pictures collectively:

Gallery

See also 

 Cain and Abel (Tintoretto)

References

Sources 

 Biadene, Susanna, ed. (1990). "Ceiling of the Church of Santo Spirito in Isola". Translated by Hecker, Sharon; Rylands, Philip; Wilkins, Elizabeth. In Titian: Prince of Painters. Italy: Prestel. pp. 255–58.
 Gronau, Georg (1904). Titian. London: Duckworth and Co; New York: Charles Scribner's Sons. pp. 123–25, 300.
 Kahr, Madlyn (1966). "Titian's Old Testament Cycle". Journal of the Warburg and Courtauld Institutes, 29: pp. 193–205. 
 Ricketts, Charles (1910). Titian. London: Methuen & Co. Ltd. p. 102.

1540s paintings
Paintings by Titian
Paintings depicting Cain and Abel